Minas Avetisyan (July 20, 1928 — February 24, 1975) was an Armenian painter.

Biography 

Minas Avetisyan was born in the village of Jajur, Soviet Armenia. His mother, Sofo, was a daughter of the priest from Kars. His father, Karapet, was a smith from Mush. His wife was Gayane Mamajanyan.

The main theme of his works was Armenian nature, the nature of Jajur, the religion, poor people, mountains, fields etc.

Avetisyan emerged as an artist at the "Exhibition of Five" in Yerevan (1962). Numerous specialists and visitors to the exhibition appreciated greatly his work. Avetisian's method differs from the method of plein-air painting which was once widespread in Armenian art. For him working from nature was no more than a preliminary stage, and the main portion of the work on the canvas was done in his studio.

In 1967, he first appeared on film in the censored and suppressed documentary The Color of Armenian Land by his friend Mikhail Vartanov.

In 1975, Avetisyan died under the wheels of the car, which stopped off at the sidewalk. According to some sources, he was murdered by the KGB.

See also
House Museum of Minas Avetisyan

References

External links
Minas Avetisyan's biography
Minas Avetisyan in the films of Mikhail Vartanov at PARAJANOV.com

1928 births
1975 deaths
People from Shirak Province
Abstract expressionist artists
Ethnic Armenian painters
Soviet painters
Soviet Armenians
20th-century Armenian painters